Windsor Forks is a community in the Canadian province of Nova Scotia, located in the Municipal District of West Hants .

Education 
Windsor Forks is home to the Windsor Forks District School which is teaches from primary to grade 5

References

Windsor Forks on Destination Nova Scotia

Communities in Hants County, Nova Scotia
General Service Areas in Nova Scotia